The Marshall Islands moray (Gymnothorax marshallensis) is a moray eel found in coral reefs in the western Pacific Ocean. It was first named by Schultz in 1953,

References

marshallensis
Fish described in 1953